Leo R. Smith (born 1947) is an American sculptor and folk artist from Winona, Minnesota, Minnesota.  He works primarily in wood. Life on the Mississippi River, past and present, local people, and the flora & fauna provide inspiration for Smith's lifelike folk figures. His innovative work has been exhibited in museums, galleries and fine shops and has brought wide acclaim throughout the US. A collection of over 400 Leo Smith sculptures is displayed on a rotating basis at the Minnesota Marine Art Museum in Winona, MN.

References
Better Homes and Gardens Santa Claus Collection (vol.6). Des Moines, IA: Meredith Corp., 2004.

External links
 Leo Smith Art
 Minnesota Marine Art Museum
 Leo Smith Folk Art

1947 births
Living people
American sculptors
Folk artists
American marine artists
People from Winona, Minnesota